Tetragnatha tenera, is a species of spider of the genus Tetragnatha. It is found in India, Sri Lanka and Queensland.

See also
 List of Tetragnathidae species

References

Tetragnathidae
Endemic fauna of Sri Lanka
Spiders of Asia
Spiders of Australia
Spiders described in 1892